The 1994 Tondeña 65 Rhum Masters season was the 16th season of the franchise in the Philippine Basketball Association (PBA). Formerly known as Ginebra San Miguel.

Draft picks

Notable dates
April 5: Tondeña 65 escaped with an 89-87 victory over Shell Rimula X for their first win of the season after six straight losses and a 14-game losing streak dating back from the Governor's Cup of last year. Jayvee Gayoso topscored for the team with 32 points. 

April 10: Top draftee Noli Locsin banged in a night-high 34 points, including 14 in the last quarter as he led Tondeña to a 107-98 victory over Alaska for their second win in eight games to keep their hopes alive in a bid for the last semifinals slot. 

July 17: Tondeña import Mitchell Wiggins scored a season-high 78 points as the Rhum Masters defeated Sta.Lucia Realtors in Overtime, 150-148. 

October 16: Tondeña whipped Sta.Lucia, 131-123, to stay alive in its hunt for the elusive semifinals berth in the Governor’s Cup. Rhum Masters import Steve Hood finished the game with a high of 67 points.

Roster

Transactions

Trades

Additions

Recruited imports

References

Barangay Ginebra San Miguel seasons
Tondena